Anjali Nair is an Indian actress who has appeared in Tamil films. After making her debut in the Tamil film Nedunalvaadai (2019), she has been seen in films including Taanakkaran (2022) and Yenni Thuniga (2022).

Career
Anjali Nair made her acting debut in Nedunalvaadai (2019), and won positive acclaim for her portrayal of a village-based character, with a reviewer from The Hindu calling her performance a "revelation". In addition, a reviewer from The New Indian Express noted that "debutant Anjali Nair holds this film together", while Times of India wrote the film is "supported by decent acting by Anjali".

In 2022, Anjali appeared in three Tamil films - the police drama Taanakkaran, the thriller Yenni Thuniga and the romantic comedy Kaalangalil Aval Vasantham. Anjali also spoke out against film producers who had asked her to change her stage name, owing to the presence of another actress of the same name.

Filmography
Films

References

External links 
 

Indian film actresses
Tamil actresses
Living people
Actresses in Tamil cinema
21st-century Indian actresses
Year of birth missing (living people)